Jason James Richter  (born January 29, 1980) is an American actor and musician. He is best known for his role in the Free Willy film series as Jesse, the boy who befriends Willy the orca.

Early life
Richter was born on January 29, 1980, in Medford, Oregon, the son of Sandra "Sandy" Montgomery, an actress, and Gregory Lynn Richter, who was in the U.S. Navy. At the age of 3, he and his family moved to Honolulu, Hawaii, where a Japanese casting agency discovered him and signed him up for three TV spots. In 1989, his family moved back to the mainland, settling in San Diego, California.

Career
Richter starred as Jesse in Free Willy (1993), a role for which he was chosen out of more than 4,000 candidates. His other films include Cops & Robbersons, The NeverEnding Story III, Free Willy 2: The Adventure Home, Laserhawk, Free Willy 3: The Rescue, and The Setting Son. He also reprised his role as Jesse in the music video for Michael Jackson's "Childhood", which was featured in Free Willy 2: The Adventure Home. In 2021, he appeared in the thriller The Little Things, his first studio film since the Free Willy films.

Between the Free Willy roles, he had TV guest roles on Sabrina, the Teenage Witch, Rugrats and The Client.

Following his appearance in Ricochet River, Richter took a decade long hiatus from acting where he was the guitarist and bassist for Blue Root and Fermata, respectively.

Filmography

Film

Television

Music videos

Additional credits
 The Quiet Loud (2013) ... Paul (short film; directed, produced and written by)
 Remember the Sultana (2015) ... Erastus Winters, Cpl William Norton, Pvt. John Zazier (documentary film; voice)

References

External links
 
 Jason James Richter on Instagram

1980 births
Living people
20th-century American male actors
21st-century American male actors
American male child actors
American male film actors
American male television actors
Musicians from New Jersey
People from Medford, Oregon